Corbin Bosch (born 10 September 1994) is a South African cricketer. He played in the 2014 Under-19 Cricket World Cup. 
He is the son of South African former cricketer Tertius Bosch.

Career
Bosch made his first-class debut for Titans in the 2017–18 Sunfoil Series on 28 September 2017. He made his List A debut for Northerns in the 2017–18 CSA Provincial One-Day Challenge on 7 January 2018.

In June 2018, Bosch was named in the squad for the Titans team for the 2018–19 season. In July 2019, he was selected to play for the Dublin Chiefs in the inaugural edition of the Euro T20 Slam cricket tournament. However, the following month the tournament was cancelled.

In September 2019, Bosch was named in the squad for the Tshwane Spartans team for the 2019 Mzansi Super League tournament. In April 2021, he was named in Northerns' squad, ahead of the 2021–22 cricket season in South Africa.

In May 2022, Corbin replaced Nathan Coulter-Nile in Rajasthan Royals for IPL 2022 season.

He represented Barbados Royals in the 2022 Caribbean Premier League. He was brought by Paarl Royals for SA20 league for the 2022 season.

References

External links
 

Living people
1994 births
South African cricketers
Northerns cricketers
Titans cricketers
Tshwane Spartans cricketers